Mizyeneh or Mazyanah is a small Greek Orthodox Christian village located in Western Syria close to the Lebanese borders and administratively belonging to the Homs Governorate. According to the Syria Central Bureau of Statistics, Mizyeneh had a population of 2,769 in the 2004 census. Its inhabitants are predominantly Christians. The village has two Greek Orthodox Churches.

References

Populated places in Talkalakh District
Eastern Orthodox Christian communities in Syria
Christian communities in Syria